DCO may refer to: Diploma in Community Ophthalmology

Astronomy
 Dark compact object, a dark compact star

Technology
 Device configuration overlay, of a computer hard disk drive
 Digitally controlled oscillator, in electronics
 Siemens DCO, a telephone switch
 Drift City Online, a game
 Domain controller, on Microsoft Servers
 Developer Certificate of Origin, used in open source software projects to verify individual contributions

Other
Deep Carbon Observatory
Development Consent Order, the means of obtaining permission for nationally significant projects in England and Wales
Dimension Century Orguss, anime series
Direct commission officer, a military rank
Disney Channel Original (disambiguation)
District coordination officer, a civil service position in Pakistan
The British Columbia Regiment (Duke of Connaught's Own), a regiment of the Canadian Forces
Duke of Cambridge's Own, aka Middlesex Regiment
Dynamic Creative Optimization, a term used in Programmatic marketing
 D.Co., an abbreviation used for the United States District Court for the District of Colorado
Docket Control Order, a legal document used to confirm court deadlines.
Document Control Officer controls access to documents that are restricted to certain people